The Karnataka State Film Awards 2015, presented by Government of Karnataka, to felicitate the best of Kannada Cinema released in the year 2015. The ceremony was held in Bengaluru on 13 November 2016.

Lifetime achievement award

For the first time a separate jury was appointed to select the Lifetime Achievement Awards under the chairmanship of veteran director S. K. Bhagavan.

Jury 

A committee headed by Naganna was appointed to evaluate the awards.

Film Awards

Other Awards

References

2015